Emily Nussbaum (born February 20, 1966) is an American television critic. She served as the television critic for The New Yorker from 2011 until 2019. In 2016, she won the Pulitzer Prize for Criticism.

Early life 
Nussbaum was born in the United States to mother Toby Nussbaum and Bernard Nussbaum, who served as White House Counsel to President Bill Clinton.

Nussbaum was raised in Scarsdale, New York, and graduated from Oberlin College in 1988. She earned a master's degree in poetry from New York University and started a doctoral program in literature, but decided not to pursue teaching.

Career 
After living in Providence, Rhode Island, and Atlanta, Georgia, Nussbaum began writing reviews of TV shows following her infatuation with the series Buffy the Vampire Slayer and posting at the website Television Without Pity. She began writing for Lingua Franca and served as editor-in-chief of Nerve. She also wrote for Slate and The New York Times.

Nussbaum then worked at New York magazine, where she was the creator of the "Approval Matrix" feature and wrote about culture and television. She was at New York for seven years and was the culture editor.

In 2011, she became the television critic at The New Yorker, taking over from Nancy Franklin. She won a National Magazine Award for Columns and Commentary in 2014 and the Pulitzer Prize for Criticism in 2016.

Personal life 
Nussbaum is married to journalist Clive Thompson. They have two children.

Awards 
 2014: National Magazine Awards, Columns and Commentary. Honors political and social commentary; news analysis; and reviews and criticism
 2016: Pulitzer Prize for Criticism

Bibliography

Books

Essays and reporting

Blog posts and online columns
 
 
 
 
 
 
———————
Notes

References

External links
 
 

1966 births
Living people
21st-century American non-fiction writers
21st-century American women writers
American people of Polish-Jewish descent
American television critics
American women journalists
Jewish American writers
The New Yorker critics
Pulitzer Prize for Criticism winners
Oberlin College alumni
New York University alumni
21st-century American Jews